Damian Adam Rączka (born August 5, 1987 in Wodzisław Śląski) is a Polish footballer who plays for Wacker Nordhausen. Rączka participated in the 2007 FIFA U-20 World Cup.

Career

International
He also was called up for the U-20 tournament in Jordan, before playing in the 2007 U-20 World Cup in Canada.

References

External links
 

Living people
1987 births
Polish footballers
Poland youth international footballers
Polish expatriate footballers
Borussia Mönchengladbach II players
FC Schalke 04 II players
1. FSV Mainz 05 II players
PFC Lokomotiv Mezdra players
Expatriate footballers in Germany
Expatriate footballers in Bulgaria
First Professional Football League (Bulgaria) players
People from Wodzisław Śląski
Sportspeople from Silesian Voivodeship
Association football defenders